Llarg de Copons was one of the main warlords of the Carlists of  Catalonia in the Second Carlist War (1846–49).

In 1838, he was appointed commander of Tarragona with Vall and Josep Masgoret i Marcó. Shortly afterwards he led the Carlists in the Battle of Vilallonga del Camp, during which 138 were killed.

References

People from Anoia
Military personnel from Catalonia